Haus Lange and Haus Esters are two residential houses designed by Ludwig Mies van der Rohe in Krefeld, Germany, for German industrialists Hermann Lange and Josef Esters. They were built between 1928 and 1930 in the Bauhaus style. The houses have now been converted into museums for Contemporary art.

History
Hermann Lange and Josef Esters established in 1920 the "Vereinigte Seidenwebereien AG" (United Silk Weaving Mills Company), or Verseidag. Verseidag commissioned at the end of 1930 to Ludwig Mies van der Rohe the realisation of an office and warehouse building in the Verseidag factory buildings in Krefeld. The so-called Verseidag Färberei and HE building were completed in 1931.

In 1927, Josef Esters and Hermann Lange commissioned the design of two adjoining houses to the architect Ludwig Mies van der Rohe. The two houses were built between 1928 and 1930 after the ideas from Bauhaus and other Modernists. They are not identical, but very similar in their geometric appearance and the use of backed brick as a building material. Closed on the street side, both have high windows that open onto a landscaped garden. The gardens alternate grassed areas, paths and flowerbeds according to geometric principles that evoke the continuity of interior and exterior spaces.

In 1955, the heir of Hermann Lange decided to present his father's collections in the Lange House and organized contemporary art exhibitions  before donating them to the City of Krefeld in 1968. Ten years later, in 1978, the Haus Esters was in turn sold to the City of Krefeld. Transformed into museums of contemporary art, the two houses have since then formed, together with the Kaiser Wilhelm Museum, the Kunstmuseen Krefeld (Krefeld Art Museums). They are only open to the public during exhibitions.

See also
 Villa Wolf (Gubin) 
 Villa Tugendhat in Brno

References

Bibliography

External links

 

Buildings and structures in Krefeld
Ludwig Mies van der Rohe buildings
Modernist architecture in Germany
Museums in North Rhine-Westphalia
Art museums and galleries in Germany

de:Krefeld#Haus Lange/Haus Esters